Gary Donatelli (born March 11, 1951 in Northbrook, Illinois, USA) is an American television soap opera director. Beside television work, Gary directed "Billion Dollar Rockets," a music video for the One Life Many Voices CD and "Lean On Me," a series of three mini dramas for post 911.

Directing Credits

Another World (unknown episodes)
One Life to Live (1990-2013)
Caged Innocence (TV Movie)

Awards and nominations
Daytime Emmy Award
Nominated, 2007, Directing Team, One Life to Live
Nominated, 2004, Directing Team, One Life to Live

External links

American television directors
1951 births
People from Northbrook, Illinois
Living people
Glenbrook North High School alumni